Gaziyev is an Azerbaijani masculine surname, its feminine counterpart is Gaziyeva. It may refer to
Bahaddin Gaziyev (born 1965), Azerbaijani journalist
Govhar Gaziyeva (1887–1960), Azerbaijani stage actress
Rahim Gaziyev (born 1943), Azerbaijani Defense Minister (1992–1993)
Tarkhan Gaziyev (born 1965), Chechen militant commander 

Azerbaijani-language surnames